The 2020–21 season was the 56th season in the existence of SC Cambuur and the club's fifth consecutive season in the second division of Dutch football. In addition to the domestic league, SC Cambuur participated in this season's edition of the KNVB Cup.

Players

First-team squad

Competitions

Overall record

Eerste Divisie

League table

Results summary

Results by round

Matches
The league fixtures were announced on 28 July 2020.

KNVB Cup

References

SC Cambuur seasons
SC Cambuur